(8014) 1990 MF is a sub-kilometer near-Earth object and potentially hazardous asteroid in the Apollo group. It was discovered by American astronomer Eleanor Helin at the Palomar Observatory in California on 26 June 1990. On 23 July 2020, it came within 0.055 AU of the Earth—about 21 times the Moon's distance.

References

External links 
 
 
 

008014
Discoveries by Eleanor F. Helin
008014
19900626